Christopher Roger Bartley (born 2 February 1984) is a British rower who competed at the 2012 Summer Olympics and 2016 Summer Olympics.

Personal life
Bartley was educated at The King's School, Chester, where he was schoolmates with fellow Olympian Tom James, and studied biology at the University of Nottingham.

Rowing career
Bartley was part of the British squad that topped the medal table at the 2011 World Rowing Championships in Bled, where he won a bronze medal as part of the lightweight coxless four with Richard Chambers, Paul Mattick and Rob Williams. He won a silver medal at the 2012 Olympic Games as part of the men's lightweight four, with Peter Chambers, Rob Williams and Richard Chambers.

He competed at the 2013 World Rowing Championships in Chungju, where he won a bronze medal as part of the lightweight coxless four with Adam Freeman-Pask, Will Fletcher and Jono Clegg.
The following year he competed at the 2014 World Rowing Championships in Bosbaan, Amsterdam, where he won a bronze medal as part of the lightweight coxless four with Mark Aldred, Peter Chambers and Richard Chambers.

In 2016 he was selected for the British Olympic team and competed in the men's lightweight coxless four event with Jono Clegg, Mark Aldred and Peter Chambers, finishing in seventh place.

References

External links

 
 
 
 

1984 births
Living people
Welsh male rowers
British male rowers
Sportspeople from Wrexham
Rowers at the 2012 Summer Olympics
Rowers at the 2016 Summer Olympics
Olympic rowers of Great Britain
Olympic silver medallists for Great Britain
Welsh Olympic medallists
Alumni of the University of Nottingham
People educated at The King's School, Chester
Olympic medalists in rowing
Medalists at the 2012 Summer Olympics
Members of Leander Club
World Rowing Championships medalists for Great Britain
European Rowing Championships medalists